Dirk Helmig (born 3 May 1965) is a German football manager and former midfielder.

References

External links
 

1965 births
Living people
German footballers
German football managers
Bundesliga players
2. Bundesliga players
Rot-Weiss Essen players
VfL Bochum players
1. FC Bocholt players
1. FC Bocholt managers
Association football midfielders